Tuscarawas Valley High School, also known as simply Tusky Valley, is a public high school in Zoarville, Ohio. It is the only high school in the Tuscarawas Valley Local Schools district. Athletic teams compete as the Trojans.

Sport
Tusky Valley offers ten sports at the varsity level: football, cross country, volleyball, soccer, golf, wrestling, basketball, track, baseball, and softball.

References

External links
 District Website

High schools in Tuscarawas County, Ohio
Public high schools in Ohio